Vučevica may refer to the following places:

Vučevica, village in Klis, Croatia
Vučevica, village in Vladimirci, Serbia